Caesium hydroxide is a strong base (pKa= 15.76) containing the highly reactive alkali metal caesium, much like the other alkali metal hydroxides such as sodium hydroxide and potassium hydroxide. Caesium hydroxide is corrosive enough to quickly dissolve through glass.

Due to its high reactivity, caesium hydroxide is extremely hygroscopic. Laboratory caesium hydroxide is typically a hydrate.

It is an anisotropic etchant of silicon, exposing octahedral planes. This technique can form pyramids and regularly shaped etch pits for uses such as Microelectromechanical systems. It is known to have a higher selectivity to etch highly p-doped silicon than the more commonly used potassium hydroxide.

This compound is not commonly used in experiments due to the high extraction cost of caesium and its reactive behaviour. It acts in similar fashion to the compounds rubidium hydroxide and potassium hydroxide, although more reactive.

References

External links
 NIOSH Pocket Guide to Chemical Hazards
 NIST Standard Reference Database

Caesium compounds
Hydroxides
Deliquescent substances